Ab Barik Rural District is a rural district (dehestan) in the Central District of Sonqor County, Kermanshah Province, Iran. At the 2006 census, its population was 6,419 in 1,561 families. The rural district has 18 villages.

References 

Rural Districts of Kermanshah Province
Sonqor County